István Bárány (20 December 1907 – 21 February 1995) was a Hungarian swimmer who competed at the 1924, 1928 and 1932 Summer Olympics.

In 1924 he was twelfth in the 100 m freestyle. Four years later he won a silver medal in 100 m freestyle and was fourth in the 4×200 m freestyle relay. In 1932, he won a bronze medal in the 4×200 m freestyle relay and was eliminated in a semifinal of 100 m freestyle.

Between 1926 and 1931 Bárány won four European titles. In 1929 he became the second person, after Johnny Weissmuller, to swim 100 m within a minute. Bárány held a PhD in law and political science. From 1957 to 1959 he served as the general secretary of the Hungarian Swimming Association. He was also a national coach and an international referee and wrote more than 30 books on swimming. In 1978 he was inducted into the International Swimming Hall of Fame.

See also
 List of members of the International Swimming Hall of Fame

References

External links

1907 births
1995 deaths
Sportspeople from Eger
Hungarian male swimmers
Olympic swimmers of Hungary
Swimmers at the 1924 Summer Olympics
Swimmers at the 1928 Summer Olympics
Swimmers at the 1932 Summer Olympics
Olympic silver medalists for Hungary
Olympic bronze medalists for Hungary
World record setters in swimming
Olympic bronze medalists in swimming
Hungarian male freestyle swimmers
European Aquatics Championships medalists in swimming
European champions for Hungary
Medalists at the 1932 Summer Olympics
Medalists at the 1928 Summer Olympics
Olympic silver medalists in swimming
20th-century Hungarian people